This is a list of last monarchs of Asia.

See also 
 Monarchies in Asia

Last Asia
Last Monarchs
Monarchis in Asia
Last list